Humberto is a Portuguese and Spanish masculine given name of Germanic origin. It may refer to:

Humberto Aguilar Coronado
Humberto Ak'ab'al
Humberto Albiñana
Humberto Albornoz
Humberto Alonso Morelli
Humberto Alonso Razo
Humberto Andrade Quezada
Humberto André Redes Filho
Humberto Anguiano
Humberto Arencibia
Humberto Aspitia
Humberto Ballesteros
Humberto Barbosa
Humberto Bedford
Humberto Benítez Treviño
Humberto Biazotti
Humberto Blasco
Humberto Brenes
Humberto Briceño
Humberto Briseño Sierra
Humberto Bruni Lamanna
Humberto Calzada
Humberto Castellanos
Humberto Castro
Humberto Cervantes Vega
Humberto Clayber
Humberto Coelho
Humberto Contreras
Humberto Costa
Humberto Costantini
Humberto Cota
Humberto Cruz
Humberto Curi
Humberto De la Calle
Humberto Delgado
Humberto Domingo Mayans
Humberto Donoso
Humberto Dávila Esquivel
Humberto Díaz Casanueva
Humberto Elgueta
Humberto Elizondo
Humberto Fernandes
Humberto Fernández Morán
Humberto Fierro
Humberto Filizola
Humberto Fontova
Humberto Fuentes
Humberto Fuenzalida (1904–1966), Chilean geographer, geologist and paleontologist
Humberto García
Humberto García Reyes
Humberto Gatica
Humberto Gessinger
Humberto González
Humberto Gordon
Humberto Grondona
Humberto Guerra Allison
Humberto Gómez Landero
Humberto Hernandez-Haddad
Humberto Hernandez Jr.
Humberto Hernández
Humberto Hernández (cyclist)
Humberto Hernández (footballer)
Humberto Honorio
Humberto I (Buenos Aires Underground)
Humberto Ivaldi
Humberto Lay
Humberto Leal Garcia
Humberto Lepe Lepe
Humberto Llanos
Humberto Lugo Gil
Humberto Luna
Humberto López Lena
Humberto López y Guerra
Humberto Macías Romero
Humberto Mariles
Humberto Martins Barbosa
Humberto Martínez
Humberto Maschio
Humberto Maturana
Humberto Mauro
Humberto Mauro Gutiérrez
Humberto Mauro da Silva Teixeira
Humberto Medina
Humberto Medina (dancer)
Humberto Medina (footballer)
Humberto Megget
Humberto Mendoza
Humberto Millán Salazar
Humberto Monserrate Anselmi
Humberto Moreira
Humberto Moré
Humberto Nilo
Humberto Núñez
Humberto Ortega
Humberto Osorio
Humberto Paim de Macedo
Humberto Padrón
Humberto Parra
Humberto Posada
Humberto Prieto Herrera
Humberto Quintero
Humberto Ramos
Humberto Rivas Mijares
Humberto Robinson
Humberto Rodríguez "El Gato"
Humberto Roque Villanueva
Humberto Rosa
Humberto Rosa (footballer)
Humberto Rosa (painter)
Humberto Ríos Labrada
Humberto Saavedra
Humberto Selvetti
Humberto Sierra
Humberto Solano
Humberto Solás
Humberto Soriano
Humberto Sorí Marin
Humberto Soto
Humberto Soto (heavyweight boxer)
Humberto Sousa Medeiros
Humberto Suazo
Humberto Sánchez
Humberto Tapia
Humberto Teixeira
Humberto Toledo
Humberto Tomasina
Humberto Tony García
Humberto Tozzi
Humberto Viola
Humberto Vélez
Humberto Zurita
Humberto de Alencar Castelo Branco
Humberto de Araújo Benevenuto
Humberto de Campos
Humberto Álvarez Machaín

See also
Humberto Vidal explosion
Hurricane Humberto
Humbert, a Germanic given name

Portuguese masculine given names
Spanish masculine given names